Eunoe hartmanae is a scale worm described from the Davis Sea, Antarctica at depths of 160–540 m.

Description
Number of segments 39; elytra 15 pairs. Dorsum dark grey with two slender white lines; ventrum not pigmented. Anterior margin of prostomium with an acute anterior projection. Lateral antennae inserted ventrally (beneath prostomium and median antenna). Notochaetae about as thick as neurochaetae. Bidentate neurochaetae present.

References

Phyllodocida
Animals described in 1962